Misliya Cave, also known as the "Brotzen Cave" after Fritz Brotzen, who first described it in 1927, is a collapsed cave at Mount Carmel, Israel, containing archaeological layers from the Lower Paleolithic and Middle Paleolithic periods. The site is significant in paleoanthropology for the discovery of what were from 2018 to 2019 considered to be the earliest known remains attributed to Homo sapiens outside Africa, dated to 185,000 years ago. Since the time of its discovery in 2011, Jebel Faya, in the United Arab Emirates, had been considered to be the oldest settlement of anatomically-modern humans outside Africa, with its deepest assemblage being dated to 125,000 years ago.

Excavations

Excavations by teams of University of Haifa and University of Tel Aviv were conducted in the 2000/1 season, yielding finds dated to between 300,000 and 150,000 years ago.

Misliya-1 fossil
Of special interest is the Misliya-1 fossil, an upper jawbone discovered in 2002, and at first dated to "possibly 150,000 years ago" and classified as "early modern Homo sapiens" (EMHS). In January 2018, the date of the fossil has been revised to between 177,000 and 194,000 years ago (95% CI). This qualifies Misliya-1 as one of the oldest known fossil of H. sapiens, of comparable age to the Omo remains (as well as those of Herto, identified as "archaic Homo sapiens", or Homo sapiens idaltu), and the second oldest modern humans ever found outside of Africa, the oldest being the skull Apidima 1 from the south western Peloponnese dated to roughly 210,000 years ago.

See also
Anatomically modern humans
List of human evolution fossils
Northern Dispersal
Recent African origin of modern humans

References

External links

 Mina Weinstein-Evron et al.: Introducing Misliya Cave, Mount Carmel, Israel: A new continuous Lower/Middle Paleolithic sequence in the Levant. In: Eurasian Prehistory. Band 1, Nr. 1, 2003, S. 31–55.
 Mina Weinstein-Evron et al.: A Window into Early Middle Paleolithic Human Occupational Layers: Misliya Cave, Mount Carmel, Israel. In: Paleo Anthropology. 2012: 202−228, doi:10.4207/PA.2012.ART75
 Hélène Valladas, Norbert Mercier, Israel Hershkovitz et al.: Dating the Lower to Middle Paleolithic transition in the Levant: A view from Misliya Cave, Mount Carmel, Israel. In: Journal of Human Evolution. Band 65, Nr. 5, 2013, S. 585–593, doi:10.1016/j.jhevol.2013.07.005

Caves of Israel
Prehistoric sites in Israel
Recent African origin of modern humans
Paleoanthropological sites
Mount Carmel